This is a list of all time foreign players who have signed professional contracts with Flamengo.

Players in bold currently still play for the club.

Last updated on 20 December 2022.

1 Includes Friendlies, FIFA Club World Cup, Intercontinental Cup, Recopa Sudamericana, Supercopa Libertadores, Copa Mercosur, Copa de Oro, Supercopa do Brasil, Primeira Liga, Torneio Rio-São Paulo, Torneio do Povo.
* Includes only Friendlies.

Number of foreigners by country

References

External links

Association football player non-biographical articles